Passive Inspection CubeSats, or PICS, is a technology demonstration spacecraft mission utilizing two CubeSat miniaturized satellites, identified as PIC-A and PIC-B. The project was developed by students at Brigham Young University (BYU) as part of NASA's Educational Launch of Nanosatellites (ELaNA) initiative beginning in 2016. The satellites are outfitted with cameras to be able to get a 360-degree view to visually assess the exterior of other spacecraft and detect possible damage. BYU professor David Long termed the project a "spacecraft selfie cam."

PIC-A and PIC-B were originally scheduled to be launched in 2018, but launch was delayed until 2021. PICs was successfully launched into orbit along with eight other CubeSats during Virgin Orbit's Launch Demo 2 on January 17, 2021. In Virgin Orbit's first successful air-launch-to-orbit, the Boeing 747-400 Cosmic Girl carried a LauncherOne orbital rocket from Mojave Air and Space Port to the Pacific Ocean, where LauncherOne separated from the aircraft and achieved orbit.

See also

List of CubeSats
Educational Launch of Nanosatellites

References

External links
 Advanced Spacecraft Group at BYU
 Passive CubeSats for Remote Inspection of Space Vehicles, BYU Microwave Earth Remote Sensing
 NASA ELaNa 20 Fact Sheet
 video about PICS launch

Brigham Young University
Student satellites
Spacecraft launched in 2021
CubeSats
Amateur radio satellites